Fish Tycoon is a casual game created and developed by Last Day of Work. One of the top-selling downloadable games of 2004, 2005, and 2006, Fish Tycoon was later ported to cell phone, retail, and Nintendo DS.

Gameplay 
Players take on the role of a fish store owner who must breed and care for hundreds of different kinds of exotic fish, all the while attempting to keep the fish store economically viable long enough to achieve the ultimate objective: breeding the Seven Magic Fish of Isola.  The story for this game is that on the mysterious island of Isola there was a lagoon where the most magnificent fish swam. These fish were held together by the 7 magic fish but one day all of the fish have disappeared. Thus, the player has to cross-breed fish to rediscover the 7 magic fish, solve the genetic puzzle, and "restore the island to its former glory."

Magic fishes 
There are 7 magic fishes in Fish Tycoon:
 Greenfin Spotanus
 Speckled Leaffish
 Crimson Comet
 Oriental Goldbulb
 Orange Snooper
 Wasp Grouper
 Canary Fire-Arrow

Awards
Parents' Choice Award 2004
iParenting Media Award 2006
Handango Champion Award 2005
PocketPC Magazine Best Software Award Nominee edeedxerStar Award 2005

References

External links
The Official Website of Fish Tycoon
Fish Tycoon Breeding Guide
 Fish Tycoon Google Play

2004 video games
Android (operating system) games
Big Fish Games games
Business simulation games
IOS games
Last Day of Work games
MacOS games
Majesco Entertainment games
Mobile games
Nintendo DS games
Palm OS games
Single-player video games
Video games developed in the United States
Windows games
Windows Mobile Professional games